The women's synchronized 10 metre platform competition at 2011 World Aquatics Championships was held on July 18 with the preliminary round in the morning and the final in the evening session.

Medalists

Results
The preliminary round was held at 10:00 local time. The final was held at 17:15.

Green denotes finalists The top twelve teams advance to the final.

References

External links
World Aquatics Championships: Women's 10 m synchro platform entry list, from OmegaTiming.com; retrieved 2011-07-17.

Women's 10 m synchro platform
Aqua